The Glory of Clementina Wing is a 1911 novel by the British writer William John Locke. In the United States it was published under the shorter title The Glory of Clementina.

Adaptations
It was adapted twice for the screen, both times in the silent era. A 1915 American short version The Glory of Clementina was followed by a 1922 American feature The Glory of Clementina directed by Emile Chautard and starring Pauline Frederick, Edward Martindel and George Cowl.

References

Bibliography
 Goble, Alan. The Complete Index to Literary Sources in Film. Walter de Gruyter, 1999.
 Phels, William Lyon. The Advance of the English novel. Dodd, Mead & Company, 1916.

1911 British novels
Novels by William John Locke
British novels adapted into films
Novels set in England